Carmelo Filardi was a Puerto Rican artist who was one of the more well-known persons in Yauco, Puerto Rico. Filardi's specialized in satire and journalistic criticism. To do this, he used depictions of average daily life in Puerto Rico to illustrate his thoughts.

He was a caricaturist and his work is included in University of Puerto Rico collections.

His first published cartoon in El Mundo was in 1927. In 1947, he published a book called Un año de historia en caricaturas, which contained a selection of his works from 1946 to 1947. In 1971, he published a book called Una Época de historia en Caricaturas. The book contained a collection of his works from 1948-1963. Eliseo Combas Guerra, wrote the prologue, selected the cartoons and annotated the work for the book. The book was published by Editorial Universitaria of the University of Puerto Rico.

Filardi's works and cultural influences have been featured and discussed in numerous books, publications and national archives such as:
 Women, Creole Identity, and Intellectual Life in Early Twentieth-century by Magali Roy Féquière
 Harry S. Truman library & museum
 Journal of the Center for Puerto Rican Studies(Vol. 20, Issue 1)
 Así es la vida (That's Life) by "Joaquín" Jack Delano
 Medios y resistencia en la era muñocista: el periódico El Mundo y la caricatura de Filardi ante el proyecto histórico del Partido Popular Democrático, 1950-1960 by Rafael L. Cabrera Collazo
 Los dibujos del progreso: el mundo caricaturesco de Filardi y la crítica al desarrollismo muñocista 1950-1960 by Rafael L. Cabrera Collazo
 Recordando a Carmelo Filardi (Remembering Carmelo Filardi) by Helga I. Serrano
 Horizontes by S. Damary Burgos
 Abriendo Puertas by José Giovannetti
 Sources for the Study of Puerto Rican History: A Challenge to the Historian's Imagination  by Blanca Silvestrini-Pacheco and Maria de los Angeles Castro Arroyo
 Activismo, literatura y cambio social en el Caribe hispano: aproximación en tres movimientos by María Alejandra Aguilar-Dornelles
 Historia del Humor Gráfico en Puerto Rico by Arturo Yépez
 Analizarán el impacto de la caricatura y la sátira by Inter News Service
 El caso del señor Carmelo Filardi
 Luis Negrón López Rescatado por la historia by Héctor Luis Acevedo
 Salón de Humorismo | Exhibición 40/30
 DESTILANDO CAÑA: Resistência e rumclandestino na ilha de Porto Rico by José Manuel González Cruz
 Antología del olvido by Eugenio Ballou

There is a Carmelo Filardi Medal award.

Carmelo is directly related to the family which built the Filardi House. His father was Vincente Filardi, the primary builder. His older brothers Juan Bautista and Domingo were also contributors. The professional tennis player Alex Llompart Filardi is also related to Carmelo Filardi.

See also
Filardi House

References

Puerto Rican cartoonists
1989 deaths
People from Yauco, Puerto Rico
1900 births